Cova da Iria is a quarter in the city and civil parish of Fátima, Santarém District, Portugal. Several of the reported Marian apparitions of Our Lady of Fátima witnessed by the three small children-shepherds of Fátima in 1917 took place here.

This notorious neighborhood is considered the wealthy area of the city of Fátima where, currently, there are numerous convents, hotels and pilgrims' hostels. It is located near the places of Aljustrel and Valinhos.

History 
Cova da Iria was originally a field belonging to the family of Lúcia dos Santos in Fátima, Portugal. Lúcia and Francisco and Jacinta Marto were the three visionary children who, according to the Roman Catholic Church, received several apparitions and heavenly messages by the Blessed Virgin Mary, Mother of God.

The children frequently pastured their families' sheep on this land, and were responsible for caring for them. In the water well of Lúcia's house they received an apparition of an angel who presented himself as the Guardian Angel of Portugal. On May 13, 1917, around noon, the three little shepherds saw an apparition of a beautiful lady "made of light, holding a rosary in her hand". It is told that suddenly there was lightning, and the children began to run for shelter. Just above an oak tree, they saw again the vision of the woman, later known as Our Lady of the Rosary of Fátima, who told them not to be afraid. She said: "I come from Heaven". They saw the lady a total of six more times, the last on October 13, 1917, when the Miracle of the Sun allegedly occurred. She told them to pray the rosary to obtain the end of the Great War.

A small chapel (which was later popularly called Chapel of the Apparitions) was built at this site in the 1920s, when people were already making devotional pilgrimages there. In October 1930, the Bishop of Leiria, Dom José Alves Correia da Silva, gave his seal of approval to the reported apparitions of Our Lady of Fátima, writing in a pastoral letter: "The visions of the children in the Cova da Iria are worthy of belief".

Since the Holy See officially approved Fátima Marian apparitions and the messages given to the three shepherd children, the place has become an important center of pilgrimage. People from all over the world travel to it in a spirit of faith and penance. The chapel has been expanded and is now much larger, enclosed within two minor basilicas in the Sanctuary of Fátima complex. Also on the grounds are luxurious hotels, a lot of convents and some medical facilities.

Cova da Iria, in Fátima, Portugal, has become in one of the most important international destinations of religious tourism, receiving between six and eight million pilgrims by year.

See also
 Parish Church of Fátima
 The Miracle of Our Lady of Fatima, 1952 film
 Fatima, 2020 film

Notes

External links

  – Official website
 Sanctuary of Fatima – Online transmissions
 Pilgrims of Fatima – Official website
 "Fatima in Sister Lucia's own words" – Free online version of the memoir book written by Sister Lucia, O.C.D.
 "The True Story of Fatima" – Free online version of the book written by Father John de Marchi, I.M.C.
 Video documentary: Portugal in 150 seconds: Fatima

Our Lady of Fátima
Catholic pilgrimage sites
Geography of Portugal